The 1954 Toronto Argonauts finished in third place in the Interprovincial Rugby Football Union with a 6–8 record and failed to make the playoffs.

Regular season

Standings

Schedule

References

Toronto Argonauts seasons
1954 Canadian football season by team